The Scottish Prisons Commission was a commission established by the Scottish Government in 2007 to "analyse the impact for courts, prisons and community justice services of early release provisions contained in the Custodial Sentences and Weapons (Scotland) Act 2007".

Terms of reference
The terms of reference were:
Consider how imprisonment is currently used in Scotland and how that use fits with the Government’s wider strategic objectives.
Raise the public profile of this issue, providing better information to allow a deeper understanding of the options, outcomes and costs.
Assess the impact for courts, prisons and community justice services of early release provisions of the Custodial Sentences and Weapons (Scotland) Act 2007.

Members
The members were:
The Rt. Hon. Henry McLeish (Chair) – former First Minister of Scotland, Minister for Enterprise and Lifelong Learning, Minister for Devolution and Home Affairs
Dr Karin Dotter-Schiller – Acting Director-General, Prison Service in the Federal Ministry of Justice in Vienna, Austria; founder member, International Corrections and Prisons Association
Sheriff Alistair Duff – Dundee; Chair, Dundee branch of the Scottish Association for the Study of Offending
Geraldine Gammell – Director, The Prince's Trust in Scotland
Richard Jeffrey – President, Edinburgh Chamber of Commerce; Chair, Edinburgh Tourism Action Group
Lesley Riddoch – broadcaster and journalist
Chief Constable David Strang – Lothian and Borders Police

See also
Prison Commission (Scotland), a defunct public body that oversaw the operation of prisons in Scotland from 1877-1939
Prison Commission (England and Wales), a defunct public body that oversaw the operation of prisons in England and Wales from 1877-1963

References

External links
Scottish Prison Commission

Government agencies of Scotland
Penal system in Scotland
Crime in Scotland
2007 establishments in Scotland
Government agencies established in 2007
Scottish commissions and inquiries